Statistics of Swedish football Division 3 for the 1928–29 season.

League standings

Uppsvenska 1928–29

Östsvenska 1928–29

Mellansvenska 1928–29

Nordvästra 1928–29

Södra Mellansvenska 1928–29

Sydöstra 1928–29

Västsvenska 1928–29

Sydsvenska 1928–29

Footnotes

References 

Swedish Football Division 3 seasons
3
Sweden